The Dallas Sidekicks are an American professional indoor soccer team based in Allen, Texas, a suburb of Dallas. The team plays its home games in the Credit Union of Texas Event Center. They kicked off their inaugural season as a member of the Professional Arena Soccer League on November 3, 2012. The Sidekicks segued to the new Major Arena Soccer League (MASL) for its inaugural season on October 25, 2014. The team took a leave of absence on September 19, 2017, for one season to re-organize. On July 24, 2018, it was announced that the Dallas Sidekicks would return for the 2018–2019 season.

History
The team was named after the original Dallas Sidekicks that operated from 1984 to 2004. This new team came into existence after the Allen City Council approved a lease for the Allen Event Center for Dallas Sidekicks, LLC, in April 2012. Owner Ronnie Davis was awarded a franchise in the Professional Arena Soccer League (PASL) on May 1, 2012. In July 2012, the team held open tryouts for prospective players at the Inwood Soccer Center in Addison, Texas.

The Sidekicks returned to the field in November 2012 as a member of the Central Division of the PASL, playing their home games in the Allen Event Center in Allen, Texas, led by general manager and head coach Tatu with assistant coaches Mike Powers and Caesar Cervin. With Tatu coaching and several veteran players from the original Sidekicks on the roster, the team's marketing slogan for the season was "We're Back!" The new team honored veteran players by retiring the #11 jersey of David Doyle and #9 jersey of Tatu.

The Sidekicks defeated the Harrisburg Heat 6–2 in their PASL debut, before a PASL single-game attendance record of 5,909. The team split their regular season matches against historic rival San Diego Sockers, ending San Diego's record-setting winning streak. Dallas found their success on the field in the regular season, amassing a Central Division leading 13–3 record and qualifying for the postseason, but lost the Division Finals to the Rio Grande Valley Flash. The franchise lead the league in regular season home attendance with an average of 5,041 fans per game.

The Sidekicks returned to the Allen Event Center for the 2013–14 PASL season with their home opener victory over the expansion Wichita B-52s on Saturday, November 2, 2013. The team completed its 16-game regular season with a February 16, 2014, victory over the Harrisburg Heat. The team amassed a 14–2 record, placing second in the Central Division and qualifying for the playoffs. Dallas lost the Central Division Semifinal match to the Monterrey Flash, ending their post-season run. The Sidekicks also participated in the 2013–14 United States Open Cup for Arena Soccer, losing to Hidalgo La Fiera in the Round of 16. The team drew well at the box office, averaging 4,002 fans per game, the third best in the PASL.

Dallas was one of 23 teams in the new Major Arena Soccer League (MASL) and hosted the debut game on October 25, 2014, with the Missouri Comets visiting the Sidekicks at the Allen Event Center. The MASL was formed when the PASL absorbed six teams from the failed MISL after the 2013–14 season. After falling to Missouri in the season opener, the team won 8 games in November and December before hitting a 4-game losing skid in January. The Sidekicks regrouped and won 6 straight before closing the regular season with a loss to the Monterrey Flash, earning a 14–6 record overall. Dallas beat Oxford City FC of Texas in the Central Division semi-final but lost to eventual league champion Monterrey in the division final. The team's 3,631 per game attendance average was sixth best in the MASL.

The Sidekicks were one of just two Texas teams to return to the MASL for 2015–16. The failure of the teams in Beaumont and Hidalgo, as well as regional rivals in Wichita and Tulsa, forced a league reorganization that placed Dallas in the Pacific Division of the Western Conference. In June 2015, longtime head coach Tatu left the team, exposing financial issues with the Dallas franchise. A group of local business owners, including Bob Heckel, Sean Porter, and Craig Porter purchased the team in October 2015 and introduced a new head coach, Simon Bozas.

Year-by-year

Honors 
Central Division Championships (1)
 2012–13

Head coaches

Personnel

Roster

As of September 18, 2022

Active players

Inactive players

Developmental team

On May 20, 2013, the team announced that some of the players who participated in the 2012–13 season would be joined by prospects to compete as "Sidekicks Premier" in the Premier Arena Soccer League for the Summer 2013 PASL-Premier season. The Sidekicks Premier played their home games at the Inwood Soccer Center in Addison, Texas. The team earned a 7–1 record and placed second in the South Central Division. Although they qualified for the playoffs, team ownership elected not to make the trip to California.

2014 Sidekicks Premier season
The developmental team was scheduled to return in Summer 2014 with former Sidekicks player Nick Stavrou as head coach. They were scheduled to compete against the Wichita B-52s Premier, Texas Xtreme, Dallas Elite (formerly Atletico Barcelona), and Tulsa Revolution Premier in the PASL-Premier's Central Division. The summer schedule was cancelled after the team was unable to secure a suitable playing venue.

References

External links
Dallas Sidekicks official website
The Dallas Sidekicks Historical Archive
Major Arena Soccer League website
Sidekicks Premier team website

 
2012 establishments in Texas
Association football clubs established in 2012
Indoor soccer clubs in the United States
Major Arena Soccer League teams
Professional Arena Soccer League teams
Sidekicks 2012
Sports in Allen, Texas
Soccer clubs in Texas